Jesse Csincsak (born April 3, 1982) is an American professional snowboarder, television personality, and founder of the nonprofit organization JSAK Snowboarding, which helps snowboarders with Olympic aspirations to raise money for training, travel, and related expenses. Csincsak owns The Home Check Company, a property management company serving Colorado's mountain communities and the Arizona valley of the sun. He was also a coach at High Cascade Snowboard Camp and a snowboard instructor at Breckenridge Ski Resort.

Csincsak was the winner of the fourth season of the television reality show competition The Bachelorette, though his relationship with DeAnna Pappas did not last. Csincsak was married on August 28, 2010 to Ann Lueders, who appeared as a contestant on the thirteenth season of The Bachelor. The couple married in Las Vegas and hosted a post-wedding bash at the resort Rumor. The couple have two sons and a daughter.

Snowboarding
Csincsak is a regular stanced rider and has been competing in snowboarding since 1994.

Rankings
 2006-2007: 607th overall in Swatch TTR World Tour Rankings.
 50th in the 2007 Burton US Open Snowboarding Championships (TTR 6 Star Event) (Stratton, VT)
 16th in the 2007 Chevrolet Revolution Tour (TTR 2 Star Event) (Copper Mtn., Colorado)
 64th in the 2006 Burton US Open Snowboarding Championships (TTR 6 Star Event) (Stratton, VT)

FIS competition standings
Federal International Rankings. These are worldwide results.
 2007-2008
 654th for Half Pipe
 2006-2007
 458th for Half Pipe
 1016th in Snowboard Cross
 2005-2006
 194th for Half Pipe
 842nd in Snowboard Cross
 2004-2005
 173rd for Half Pipe
 949th in Snowboard Cross
 2003-2004
 383rd for Half Pipe
 615th in Snowboard Cross
 2002-2003
 651st in Snowboard Cross

Television appearances
 Made Season 8 Episode 9 (episode 66) He later appeared in a 2010 episode
 The Bachelorette Season 4,  April - June 2008, and was chosen by DeAnna Pappas in the final episode, over fellow suitor Jason Mesnick. The couple set their wedding date for May 9, 2009 but their relationship ended in November 2008.
True Life: "Resolutions Made and Kept"
America's Most Wanted (1 episode)
Called Beyond the Medal, covering the 2010 Winter Olympics.

References

External links
 

1982 births
Living people
Sportspeople from Colorado
American male snowboarders
Place of birth missing (living people)
Bachelor Nation contestants
Reality show winners